is a Japanese enka singer. Her singing career spanned over four decades. She married Katsuo Yamada in 1991.

Early life 
Kawanaka was born Kimiko Kawanaka in Yonago, Tottori. At a young age, she moved to Suita, Osaka where she grew up. 

In 1973, at age 18, she debuted as Kasuga Harumi and tried to become a pop idol with the release of the songs "Shinjuku Tenshin" and "Kantsubaki no Shima Kara". Both singles failed and she returned to Osaka to work at her mother's okonomiyaki restaurant. 

In 1976, she won a contest singing "Anatani Inochi Gake". She adopted stage name Miyuki Kawanaka and launched her second debut as an enka singer. In 1980 Kawanaka's single Futarizake (ふたり酒) hit, with sales over a million copies.

Her second biggest hit, "Niren-sou" (二輪草) in 1998, which sold more than a million copies in Japan alone, spending 80 weeks in the top 100 of the oricon chart.

Kawanaka was invited to perform at the annual NHK Red and White Song Festival for 24 non-consecutive years, the 7th most on the all-time list for a female artist. Her last appearance at the prestigious programme was 2011, the 62nd edition of the show.

Discography

Original works charting in the top 100.

References 

1955 births
Living people
Japanese women singers
Enka singers
People from Suita
Musicians from Osaka Prefecture
Musicians from Tottori Prefecture
People from Yonago, Tottori